The Dolmen de la Pastora (also known as Cueva de la Pastora) is a prehistoric passage grave at Valencina de la Concepción near Seville, Spain. It has been dated to the Chalcolithic Age.

Description
The dolmen is under "La Pastora" mound at Valencina de la Concepción. It is a 43-metre long gallery, made with drystone walls and roofed with slabs of limestone and granite. The passage terminates in a circular funeral chamber with a diameter of 2.5 metres, roofed with a single granite capstone. The passage is orientated towards the sunset, unlike other similar tombs in the region which tend to face towards sunrise.

Excavations in the slope of the tumulus in 1860 yielded 27 copper arrow heads of the "javelin type".

Gallery

See also
Prehistoric Iberia
Antequera Dolmens Site
Tholos de El Romeral
Bell Beaker culture

References

External links

Dolmen de La Pastora, Base de datos Patrimonio Inmueble de Andalucía

Dolmens in Spain
Archaeological sites in Andalusia
Bronze Age sites in Europe
Buildings and structures in Andalusia
Buildings and structures in the Province of Seville
Tourist attractions in Andalusia
3rd-millennium BC architecture